Mathias Trygg (born 15 March 1986 in Oslo) is a Norwegian professional ice hockey winger, who currently plays for Vålerenga of the Norwegian GET-ligaen.

Club career
He started his senior career with Manglerud Star in 2002, and played two seasons before moving to Sweden to play for Skåre. He stayed there only one season before moving back to Norway and Manglerud Star.

The 2005–06 season was kind of a break-out season for Trygg, and after the conclusion of the season he signed for the current Norwegian Champions, Vålerenga. He went on to win the Championship twice with Vålerenga, before deciding to move abroad again in 2010.

In 2010, he signed for Modo of the Swedish Elitserien, playing only 12 matches before getting loaned out to HockeyAllsvenskan club Västerås. He stayed there for two more matches before returning to Norway and Vålerenga.

For the 2014-15 season, Trygg signed for HockeyAllsvenskan club IF Björklöven, but returned to Vålerenga after a couple of months.

Personal life
His older twin brothers, Marius and Mats, also plays ice hockey, for Manglerud Star and Lørenskog respectively.

External links

1986 births
Living people
Norwegian expatriate ice hockey people
Norwegian ice hockey forwards
IF Björklöven players
Lørenskog IK players
Manglerud Star Ishockey players
Modo Hockey players
VIK Västerås HK players
Vålerenga Ishockey players
Ice hockey people from Oslo